Elections in Florida are held on the first Tuesday after the first Monday of November in even-numbered years, as provided for in Article 6 of the Florida Constitution.
For state elections, the Governor of Florida, Lieutenant Governor, and the members of the Florida Cabinet, and members of the Florida Senate are elected every four years; members of the Florida House of Representatives are elected every two years. In national elections, Florida plays an important role as the largest bellwether state, occasionally determining the outcome of elections for U.S. President — as it did in 1876 and in 2000.

In a 2020 study, Florida was ranked as the 11th hardest state for citizens to vote in. 

All citizens of the United States, over the age of eighteen and who are permanent residents of the state, may register to vote as a qualified elector of Florida unless they are convicted of a felony or found to be mentally incompetent.

State elections
The Governor of Florida, Lieutenant Governor, and the members of the Florida Cabinet are elected every four years. Members of the Florida House of Representatives are elected every two years, while members of the Florida Senate are elected every four years.

Candidates for the Florida legislature may serve no more than 2 consecutive terms (8 years) as Senator, or 4 consecutive terms (8 years) as Representative.

Voters determine whether judges at the state level should be retained, at the end of their respective term. Since this law was enacted in 1974, no judge has ever been removed from office by failure of retention.

Florida in national elections
Florida received international attention for its role in the 2000 presidential election, where George W. Bush led Al Gore by only a couple of hundred votes when the Supreme Court of the United States ended a recount. It had also played a role in the equally contested 1876 presidential election and is often seen as one of the key swing states in presidential elections.

Florida held its 2008 presidential primary on January 29, 2008 after a bill was passed in May 2007 moving it sooner on the electoral calendar. This move was in violation of party rules restricting primaries held before February 5 to Iowa, Nevada, New Hampshire, and South Carolina. The Democratic Party eventually decided to strip Florida of all its 210 delegates at the Democrats' convention, while the Republicans stripped Florida of half its delegates to the GOP convention. A federal judge dismissed a suit from Democratic Senator Bill Nelson against the DNC and chairman Howard Dean to overturn this decision.

History

In the first half of the 19th century, the right to vote was held only by white males aged 21 and over. After 1920, women were able to vote with the passing of the Nineteenth Amendment to the United States Constitution. In 1937, the requirement to pay a poll tax was repealed by the state legislature, allowing poorer Floridians to vote, and in 1944 the United States Supreme Court invalidated a system of white-only primary elections.

Florida was originally part of the Solid South, as Democrats overwhelmingly won state and federal elections during the hundred years following the Civil War. However, in 1937, the requirement to pay a poll tax was repealed by the state legislature, allowing poorer Floridians to vote, and coupled with a growing tourist industry in the mid-20th century that attracted Northern retirees, the state became electorally competitive earlier than the rest of the South. Since 1928, the state has only voted for the losing presidential candidate three times, all for losing Republicans in 1960, 1992, and 2020. In 1966, Claude Kirk was elected the first Republican governor of Florida since Reconstruction. This was followed in 1968, with Republicans winning a Senate seat in the state for the first time since Reconstruction. 

The Florida Elections Commission was established in 1973. In 2005, Jeb Bush signed a bill to abolish primary runoff elections, resulting in all primary and general elections being determined by plurality rather than majority. 

The state is dominated by Republicans on the state level, as Democrats have not held the governorship or either house of the legislature since 1999. Republicans currently have veto-proof majorities in both houses of the Florida legislature. However, the state has become increasingly since the late 2010s, as in 2018, Republicans captured both Senate seats in the state for the first time since Reconstruction. In 2020, Florida voted 7.8 points right of the nation as a whole, the furthest it has voted from the nation since 1988, and it was the first election since 1992 that Florida backed the losing candidate. In 2022, Republicans won their largest statewide victories since Reconstruction and neared 60% of the vote. In 2021, registered Republicans surpassed Democrats for the first time in state history.

Election security 
On August 8, 2018 Senator Bill Nelson told the Tampa Bay Times that Florida's voting system had been penetrated by Russian hacking efforts. Senator Nelson noted that the likely target of hacking efforts was voter rolls for the state.

During DEF CON 26 in 2018, an 11-year-old reportedly hacked into a Florida state election website replica in just 10 minutes by taking advantage of expired SSL certificates. The participants of this event also discovered vulnerabilities of the state voting machines via the memory card and rendering a voter's ballot invalid.

In May 2019, Republican Florida Governor Ron DeSantis announced Russians hacked voting databases in two Florida counties prior to the 2016 presidential election and no election results were compromised.

Party affiliation
The following statistics show party affiliation of registered Florida voters:
 In 1972, Democratic registered 69%, Republican 28%, and 3% other.
 In 1992, Democratic registered 51%, Republicans 41%, and 8% other.
 In 2013, Democrats registered 40%, Republicans 35%, and 25% other.
 In 2016, Democrats registered 38%, Republicans 36%, and 26% other.
 In 2018, Democrats registered 37%, Republicans 35%, and 28% other.
 In 2021, Democrats registered 35.6%, Republicans 35.9%, and 28.5% other.

See also
 Florida elections, 2020
 Politics of Florida
 Political party strength in Florida
 Florida Democratic Party
 Republican Party of Florida
 Government of Florida
 United States presidential elections in Florida
Women's suffrage in Florida

References

Further reading

External links
 Florida Division of Elections government website
 Florida Elections Commission government website
  (State affiliate of the U.S. League of Women Voters)
 
 
 Digital Public Library of America. Assorted materials related to Florida elections
 

 
Government of Florida
Political events in Florida